The 2003–04 FC Metz season was the club's 72nd season in existence and the club's first season back in the top flight of French football after one season of absence. In addition to the domestic league, Metz participated in this season's editions of the Coupe de France, and the Coupe de la Ligue. The season covered the period from 1 July 2003 to 30 June 2004.

Players

Squad

Pre-season and friendlies

Competitions

Overview

Ligue 1

League table

Results summary

Results by round

Matches

Coupe de France

Coupe de la Ligue

References

External links

FC Metz seasons
Metz